The Maison Coignard was a prison hospital opened during the French Revolution to house wealthy prisoners from the various prisons opened as in the course of the Reign of Terror then underway.

History
The location was originally a monastery of canonesses regular founded in 1640 by King Louis XIII, named the Priory of Our Lady of Victory of Lepanto, in honor of the Christian victory over Ottoman forces in the Battle of Lepanto in 1571.  Its site is in the corner of what is now Boulevard Diderot with Rue de Picpus.  

In 1792 the monastery was confiscated by the French government and the canonesses were forced to disband. In late 1793 the complex was leased by Eugène Coignard and converted into a 150-bed private prison hospital for those prisoners of the Terror who were able to pay for a more comfortable confinement. The majority of the people held there escaped execution. The most notorious prisoner at the Coignard House was the Marquis de Sade.

The former monastery gardens were seized by the city and used to bury the bodies of those executed at a guillotine set up nearby. The site was later purchased by surviving family members of the aristocracy who were buried in the common graves of the site. Today the cemetery is the Picpus Cemetery.

References

Christian monasteries established in the 17th century
Hospitals established in the 1790s
Hospitals in Paris
Monasteries of Canonesses Regular
Augustinian monasteries in France
Monasteries destroyed during the French Revolution
Defunct prisons in Paris
Defunct hospitals in France
12th arrondissement of Paris